Roel Degamo, the governor of Negros Oriental in the Philippines, was killed by gunmen at his home on March 4, 2023, while he was distributing aid to beneficiaries of a conditional cash transfer program. Eight others were killed in the incident.

Background
Roel Degamo was the governor of Negros Oriental at the time of his assassination. He became governor in January 2011, after Governor Agustin Perdices died. Perdices himself assumed the post following the death of Governor Emilio Macias II. Degamo was elected governor in 2013 and secured fresh mandates in the 2016 and 2019 elections.

Degamo ran for a fourth term in 2022 election, but lost to Pryde Henry Teves who was proclaimed governor. Degamo filed an electoral protest before the Commission on Elections. A recount was made, with votes for a nuisance candidate named Ruel Degamo considered as a vote for Roel Degamo. The final tally of the recount concluded Degamo as the winner and Teves' proclamation was nullified. Degamo took oath as governor on October 5, 2022, while his rival Teves voluntarily stepped down from his position on October 11, 2022.

Shooting

On March 4, 2023, at approximately 9:36 a.m., Degamo was shot several times by unidentified men at his residence in Pamplona, Negros Oriental. He was distributing aid to local beneficiaries of the Pantawid Pamilyang Pilipino Program (4Ps) program when the attack happened. He was rushed to Negros Polymedic Hospital in Sibulan, but was pronounced dead at 11:41 a.m.

Eight other people were also killed in the shooting. The deaths include a barangay kagawad and another civilian who were mistaken as Degamo's bodyguards.

Degamo would be buried at his hometown of Siaton in March 16, 2023.

Four suspects were arrested in Bayawan; while another died in an encounter with state forces.

Suspects
Murder and frustrated murder charges were filed by Department of Justice prosecutors against four individuals (as listed below) as well as twelve John Does before the Tanjay Regional Trial Court (RTC); also, charges of illegal possession of firearms, ammunition, and explosives against three of them before the Bayawan RTC. Those indicted over the assassination include:

Joven Javier – former Army ranger (La Castellana, Negros Occidental resident)
Joric Labrador – former Army ranger (Cagayan De Oro resident)
Osmundo Rivero – former Army personnel (Zamboanga City)
Benjie Rodriguez (Mindanao native)

An unidentified former soldier surrendered to authorities on March 17.

Upon request by Justice Secretary Jesus Crispin Remulla, these criminal cases were later transfered by the Supreme Court to the Manila RTC. Thirty complaints have been filed in relation to the incident.

Meanwhile, another suspect killed in pursuit operations was later identified as Arnil Labradilla of Bindoy, a former New People's Army rebel.

It was reported that there are "more or less" five other suspects.

Mastermind
The Degamo family speculates that the killing had a political motive pointing out previous killings in the province, some dating prior to the 2022 elections, of supporters of Roel Degamo. The slain governor's wife and Pamplona mayor, Janice Degamo believes that the mastermind is a "very known in the country today" but did not specify any name.

Joint Task Force Negros spokesperson Major Cenon Pancito III says that the mastermind could be a former soldier.

'Cong Teves'
Suspects Labrador and Rodriguez on March 9, 2023, has pinned a certain "Cong Teves" as the mastermind of the shooting. They testify that they were tasked to kill the governor and was told that the provincial executive was a drug lord. They said they have not met this individual personally.

Among the politicians of Negros Oriental who have served as congressman or a member of the House of Representatives who bear the Teves family name is Degamo's rival Arnolfo Teves Jr., and former governor Pryde Henry Teves.

Earlier, to dispel speculations that he has involvement in the killing, Degamo's rival Arnolfo Teves Jr. said he was undergoing stem cell treatment outside the Philippines at the time of the attack and therefore could not have planned the assassinations. He also pointed out that his brother Pryde Teves could not replace Degamo as governor and that the vice governor is his only suitable successor by law. Pryde Teves was unseated and replaced by Degamo after a recount of the 2022 election results.

Talino at Galing ng Pinoy (TGP) party-list representative Jose “Bong” Teves Jr. has also came forward to say that he is not the "Cong. Teves" referred by the suspects. He points out, that despite sharing family name with the Teveses of Negros island, that his family hails from Catanduanes in the Bicol Region.

Investigation
The Degamo family is open to suspects being placed under the government's witness protection program (WPP), to aid the investigation on the case. Two suspects were placed under the WPP.

Justice Secretary Jesus Crispin Remulla also disclosed that they have retrieved a video of the suspects discussing the planning of the assassination.

Response
President Bongbong Marcos attended Roel Degamo's wake and vowed to "bring justice" in Negros Oriental. Marcos, and other governors from other provinces condemned the killing. Marcos would order the formation of a special panel of prosecutors to look into killings in Negros Oriental including Degamo's assassination.

Interior Secretary Benhur Abalos issued a directive calling for the replacement of all police personnel in Negros Oriental following the assassination. 

The Commission on Elections vowed faster resolution of election-related protests after Senator Risa Hontiveros said that the Teves–Degamo electoral protest is related to the assassination. Senator Miguel Zubiri described the shooting as an act of political terrorism.

The Region 7 office of the Department of Social Welfare and Development provided  worth of financial assistance to the survivors and relatives of those who died from the incident.

References

Assassinations in the Philippines
2023 murders in the Philippines
March 2023 crimes in Asia
March 2023 events in the Philippines
History of Negros Oriental